Hermaea oliviae is a species of sacoglossan sea slug, a shell-less marine opisthobranch gastropod mollusk in the family Hermaeidae.

Distribution
This species is found from Southern California to British Columbia, Canada.

References

Hermaeidae
Gastropods described in 1966